Neil Hollander (born 1939, death 2021, in Paris from lung cancer) is an American writer, film director and producer, journalist and sailor who has sailed across the Atlantic, Pacific and Indian Oceans. He has conducted more than thirty interviews with Nobel Prize winners, and his work has been exhibited in a number of museums, among them the Smithsonian, the Deutsches Museum and the Jim Thompson House in Bangkok. As an author, he is largely collected by libraries worldwide.

Biography
Hollander was born in 1939 in New York City. His younger sister is the lawyer Nancy Hollander, who represented some Guantanamo Bay prisoners. During his career, Hollander has gone through several professions and has lived in various parts of the world, including Thailand, Costa Rica, and France, where he now stays. His passion for sailing took him on a three-year trip across the sea, visiting sea ports around the world and witnessing the life of people who still make their living from the sea in the old traditions. The trip was documented in the 150-minutes video story The Last Sailors: The Final Days of Working Sail, narrated by Orson Welles. He died in Paris after suffering five months of lung cancer, leaving behind a widow.

Hollander lived and worked in Paris.

Bibliography
Call out the Jungle January 1976 
The Courageous Voyage of Joan De Penguin January 1979 
The Magic Clock June 1979 
The Cook Is Captain June 1979 
Penguin Voyages July 1979 
The Great Voyage of Columbus Penguin July 1979 
The Book of Paris September 1979 
Sailor talk: Essential words and phrases in 6 languages December 1980 
The Chocolate Feast May 1982 
Chocolate Feast January 1984 
The Great Zoo Break March 1985 
The Yachtsman's Emergency Handbook: The Complete Survival Manual December 1986 
The Last Sailors: The Final Days of Working Sail February 1987 
Animal Day (Picture Knight) October 1988 
Elusive Dove: The Search for Peace During World War I March 2014

Filmography
Riding the Rails (1982)
Birds of Passage (2001)
The Last Sailors (1984)
First Flights with Neil Armstrong (1991)
Nobel Voices (2001)
Gold Lust (1984)
Touchia (1993)
Germans and their Nazi Past (2004)
Sea Devils  (Tramps)(1998)
Sea Dogs (Birds of Passage)(2001)
H for Hunger (2009)
Burma: A Human Tragedy (2011)
Goldlust (2014)
Under the Radar: Burma (2010)

References

External links
 Neil Hollander on Imdb

1939 births
Living people
American documentary film directors
American documentary film producers
Writers from Newark, New Jersey
Film producers from New Jersey